The 2019 Kehoe Cup was an inter-county hurling competition based mainly in the province of Leinster in which Antrim from Ulster also took part.

The Kehoe Cup is ranked below the Walsh Cup (tier 1). It took place in December 2018 and January 2019. Westmeath were the winners.

The Kehoe Shield was revived in 2019. Three teams competed – ,  and DCU St. Patrick's Campus. Louth were the winners.

Kehoe Cup

Kehoe Cup Format
The competition begins with a double-elimination format. The semi-finals and final are knockout. Drawn games go to extra time. If the score is still level after extra time a penalty shoot-out is held to determine the winners.

The structure of the competition is explained in each of the rounds below.

Kehoe Cup First Round

One team is given a bye to the playoff round. The remaining four teams meet in two matches – the two winners progress to the semi-finals and the two losers enter the playoff round.

Kehoe Cup Playoff Round

In the first playoff match the team given a bye in the first round plays one of the two teams that lost in the first round. The winners progress to the semi-finals.

In the second playoff match the team that lost the first playoff match play the remaining team that lost in the first round. The winners progress to the semi-finals and the losers are eliminated.

Kehoe Cup Semi-Finals

The two winning teams from the first round play each other and the two winning teams from the playoff round play each other.

Kehoe Cup Final

Kehoe Shield

Kehoe Shield Format

Each team plays the other teams once, earning 2 points for a win and 1 for a draw. The top two teams compete in the final.

Kehoe Shield Group Stage
{| class="wikitable" 
!width=20|
!width=250 style="text-align:left;"|Team
!width=20|
!width=20|
!width=20|
!width=20|
!width=30|
!width=50|
!width=20|
!width=20|
|- style="background:#D0F0C0;" 
|1||align=left|  Louth||2||2||0||0||2-38 (44)||0-31 (31)||+13||4
|- style="background:#D0F0C0;" 
|2||align=left| DCU St. Patrick's Campus||2||1||0||1||2-31 (37)||3-33 (42)|| –5||2
|-
|3||align=left| Longford||2||0||0||2||1-27 (30)||2-32 (38)||–8||0
|}

Kehoe Shield Final

References

2019
2019 in hurling
December 2018 sports events in Europe
January 2019 sports events in Europe